This list of tallest buildings in New Taipei City ranks skyscrapers in the Taiwanese city of New Taipei City by height. The tallest building in Taipei is currently the 50–story Far Eastern Mega Tower, which rises  and was completed in 2013. The tallest buildings are mostly concentrated in the modern central business district of Banqiao District.

Tallest Buildings in New Taipei
As of September 2020, the list of buildings in New Taipei at least 150 meters high is as follows according to Skyscraperpage and the Council on Tall Buildings and Urban Habitat. An equal sign (=) following a rank indicates the same height between two or more buildings. The "Year" column indicates the year of completion. The list includes only habitable buildings, as opposed to structures such as observation towers, radio masts, transmission towers and chimneys.

Tallest Buildings by District

See also
 Skyscraper
 List of tallest buildings
 List of tallest buildings in Taiwan
 List of tallest buildings in Taichung
 List of tallest buildings in Taipei
 List of tallest buildings in Kaohsiung

References

External links
 Tallest Buildings in New Taipei City on The Skyscraper Center
 Tallest Buildings in New Taipei City on The Skyscraperpage

New Taipei